The seven-arm octopus (Haliphron atlanticus) is one of the two largest known species of octopus; based on scientific records, it has a maximum estimated total length of  and mass of . The only other similarly large extant species is the giant Pacific octopus, Enteroctopus dofleini.

The genera Alloposina Grimpe, 1922, Alloposus Verrill, 1880 and Heptopus Joubin, 1929 are junior synonyms of Haliphron, a monotypic genus in the monotypic family Alloposidae, part of the superfamily Argonautoidea in the suborder Incirrata of the order Octopoda.

Description

The seven-arm octopus is so named because in males, the hectocotylus (a specially modified arm used in egg fertilization) is coiled in a sac beneath the right eye. Due to this species' thick, gelatinous tissue, the arm is easily overlooked, giving the appearance of just seven arms. However, like other octopuses, it actually has eight.

Distribution
It is deposited at the University of Copenhagen Zoological Museum.

Since then, several specimens have been caught throughout the Atlantic, as far as the Azores archipelago and near South Georgia Island.

In 2002, a single specimen of giant proportions was caught by fishermen trawling at a depth of 920 m off the eastern Chatham Rise, New Zealand. This specimen, the largest of this species and of all octopuses, was the first validated record of Haliphron from the South Pacific.

Ecology
Isotopic, photographic and video evidence have shown complex interactions between H. atlanticus and jellyfish and other gelatinous zooplankton, from feeding to protection, respectively.

Predators of H. atlanticus include the blue shark, Hawaiian monk seal, sperm whale, and swordfish.

Beak morphology

See also
Cephalopod size

References

Further reading
Bakken, T. & T. Holthe 2002. Haliphron atlanticum (Cephalopoda, Alloposidae) caught in Skorafjorden (64°N), Norway. Fauna norv. 22: 37–38.

External links

Tree of Life web project: Haliphron atlanticus
The giant octopus Haliphron atlanticus (Mollusca: Octopoda) in New Zealand waters
BBC News: Giant octopus puzzles scientists
Tony Wu Underwater Photography: Seven-arm octopus

Octopuses
Molluscs of the Atlantic Ocean
Molluscs of the Pacific Ocean
Cephalopods of Oceania
Cephalopods described in 1861
Molluscs of the Azores